The Volkswagen ID. Space Vizzion is  a concept electric vehicle wagon developed by Volkswagen. The ID. Space Vizzion is based on the MEB platform, and part of the ID. Series. The firm is planning to sell a production version of the vehicle by 2023.

The concept wagon was shown at the 2019 LA Auto Show and is capable of three rows of seating.

See also
 Volkswagen ID. Vizzion – a related sedan
 Volkswagen ID. series

References

2020s cars
Electric concept cars
Station wagons
ID._Space_Vizzion
Cars introduced in 2019